Michael DeMarco (born 19 March 1969) is a retired American Paralympic swimmer who competes at international elite competitions. He is a Paralympic bronze medalist and a four-time World bronze medalist and was a former American record holder.

References

1969 births
Living people
People from La Jolla, San Diego
Paralympic swimmers of the United States
Swimmers at the 2004 Summer Paralympics
Swimmers at the 2008 Summer Paralympics
Swimmers at the 2012 Summer Paralympics
Medalists at the 2004 Summer Paralympics
Medalists at the World Para Swimming Championships
American male breaststroke swimmers
S2-classified Paralympic swimmers